is a 2011 Japanese drama film directed by Banmei Takahashi.

Cast
 Miyuki Matsuda
 Kazuhiro Yamaji
 Reina Asami
 Chieko Matsubara

References

External links
  
 

2011 drama films
2011 films
Films directed by Banmei Takahashi
Japanese drama films
2010s Japanese films